Juan Albert Viloca Puig (born 17 January 1973) is a professional tennis player from Spain.

He turned professional in 1992. His favourite surface is clay, surface on which he achieved his both ATP finals in his whole career, although both came in 1997.

Viloca was suspended for two months in 2005 after testing positive for hydroxyprednisolone.

ATP career finals

Singles: 2 (2 runner-ups)

ATP Challenger and ITF Futures finals

Singles: 16 (7–9)

|}

Doubles: 8 (2–6)

Performance timelines

Singles

Wins over top 10 players

References

External links
 
 

1973 births
Living people
Tennis players from Catalonia
Spanish male tennis players
Tennis players from Barcelona
Doping cases in tennis